Sipha flava is a species of aphid in the family Aphididae. It is native to North America. Its common name is yellow sugarcane aphid.

This aphid is an agricultural pest of corn, rice, sorghum, and sugarcane. It also infests lawn and pasture grasses. It has been noted on crabgrasses, barleys, panic grasses, paspalums, pennisetums, and wheats. It can also be found on some sedges.

References

Chaitophorinae
Insects described in 1884
Hemiptera of North America
Agricultural pest insects
Taxa named by Stephen Alfred Forbes
Insect pests of millets